

Ga 
 Beryl Gaffney b. 1930 first elected in 1988 as Liberal member for Nepean, Ontario.
 Alfonso Gagliano b. 1942 first elected in 1984 as Liberal member for Saint-Léonard—Anjou, Quebec.
 Jean Alfred Gagné b. 1842 first elected in 1882 as Conservative member for Chicoutimi—Saguenay, Quebec.
 Christiane Gagnon b. 1948 first elected in 1993 as Bloc Québécois member for Québec, Quebec.
 Marcel Gagnon b. 1936 first elected in 2000 as Bloc Québécois member for Champlain, Quebec.
 Onésime Gagnon b. 1888 first elected in 1930 as Conservative member for Dorchester, Quebec.
 Patrick Gagnon b. 1962 first elected in 1993 as Liberal member for Bonaventure—Îles-de-la-Madeleine, Quebec.
 Paul Gagnon b. 1937 first elected in 1984 as Progressive Conservative member for Calgary North, Alberta.
 Paul-Edmond Gagnon b. 1909 first elected in 1945 as Independent member for Chicoutimi, Quebec.
 Philippe Gagnon b. 1909 first elected in 1962 as Social Credit member for Rivière-du-Loup—Témiscouata, Quebec.
 Sébastien Gagnon b. 1973 first elected in 2002 as Bloc Québécois member for Lac-Saint-Jean—Saguenay, Quebec.
 Iqwinder Gaheer b. 1993 first elected in 2021 as Liberal member for Mississauga—Malton, Ontario.
 Daniel Galbraith b. 1813 first elected in 1872 as Liberal member for Lanark North, Ontario.
 Royal Galipeau b. 1947 first elected in 2006 as Conservative member for Ottawa—Orléans, Ontario. 
 Cheryl Gallant b. 1960 first elected in 2000 as Canadian Alliance member for Renfrew—Nipissing—Pembroke, Ontario.
 Roger Gallaway b. 1948 first elected in 1993 as Liberal member for Sarnia—Lambton, Ontario.
 Daniel Gallery b. 1859 first elected in 1900 as Liberal member for St. Anne, Quebec.
 William Alfred Galliher b. 1860 first elected in 1900 as Liberal member for Yale—Cariboo, British Columbia.
 Alexander Tilloch Galt b. 1817 first elected in 1867 as Liberal-Conservative member for Town of Sherbrooke, Quebec.
 John Albert Gamble b. 1933 first elected in 1979 as Progressive Conservative member for York North, Ontario.
 Arthur D. Ganong b. 1877 first elected in 1930 as Conservative member for Charlotte, New Brunswick.
 Gilbert White Ganong b. 1851 first elected in 1896 as Liberal-Conservative member for Charlotte, New Brunswick.
 Alain Garant b. 1952 first elected in 1980 as Liberal member for Bellechasse, Quebec.
 Brian L. Gardiner b. 1955 first elected in 1988 as New Democratic Party member for Prince George—Bulkley Valley, British Columbia.
 James Garfield Gardiner b. 1883 first elected in 1936 as Liberal member for Assiniboia, Saskatchewan.
 Robert Gardiner b. 1879 first elected in 1921 as Progressive member for Medicine Hat, Alberta.
 Wilfrid Gariépy b. 1877 first elected in 1935 as Liberal member for Three Rivers, Quebec.
 Edward Joseph Garland b. 1885 first elected in 1921 as Progressive member for Bow River, Alberta.
 Jack Garland b. 1918 first elected in 1949 as Liberal member for Nipissing, Ontario.
 William Foster Garland b. 1875 first elected in 1912 as Conservative member for Carleton, Ontario.
 Marc Garneau b. 1949 first elected in 2008 as Liberal member for Westmount—Ville-Marie, Quebec.
 Raymond Garneau b. 1935 first elected in 1984 as Liberal member for Laval-des-Rapides, Quebec.
 Jean-Denis Garon first elected in 2021 as Bloc Québécois member for Mirabel, Quebec.
 Randall Garrison b. 1951 first elected in 2011 as New Democratic Party member for Esquimalt—Juan de Fuca, British Columbia. 
 Stuart Garson b. 1898 first elected in 1948 as Liberal member for Marquette, Manitoba.
 Melbourne Gass b. 1938 first elected in 1979 as Progressive Conservative member for Malpeque, Prince Edward Island.
 Guillaume Gamelin Gaucher b. 1810 first elected in 1867 as Conservative member for Jacques Cartier, Quebec.
 Athanase Gaudet b. 1848 first elected in 1884 as Nationalist Conservative member for Nicolet, Quebec.
 Joseph Gaudet b. 1818 first elected in 1867 as Conservative member for Nicolet, Quebec.
 Roger Gaudet b. 1945 first elected in 2002 as Bloc Québécois member for Berthier—Montcalm, Quebec.
 Marie-Hélène Gaudreau b. 1977 first elected in 2019 as Bloc Québécois member for Laurentides—Labelle, Quebec.
 Matthew Hamilton Gault b. 1822 first elected in 1878 as Conservative member for Montreal West, Quebec.
 André Gauthier b. 1915 first elected in 1949 as Liberal member for Lac-Saint-Jean, Quebec.
 Charles-Arthur Gauthier b. 1913 first elected in 1962 as Social Credit member for Roberval, Quebec.
 Jean-Robert Gauthier b. 1929 first elected in 1972 as Liberal member for Ottawa East, Ontario.
 Joseph Gauthier b. 1842 first elected in 1887 as Liberal member for L'Assomption, Quebec.
 Jules Gauthier b. 1892 first elected in 1949 as Liberal member for Lapointe, Quebec.
 Léo Gauthier b. 1904 first elected in 1945 as Liberal member for Nipissing, Ontario.
 Louis Joseph Gauthier b. 1866 first elected in 1911 as Liberal member for St. Hyacinthe, Quebec.
 Louis-Philippe Gauthier b. 1876 first elected in 1911 as Conservative member for Gaspé, Quebec.
 Michel Gauthier b. 1950 first elected in 1993 as Bloc Québécois member for Roberval, Quebec.
 Pierre Gauthier b. 1894 first elected in 1936 as Liberal member for Portneuf, Quebec.
 Rosaire Gauthier b. 1908 first elected in 1957 as Liberal member for Chicoutimi, Quebec.
 Charles Arthur Gauvreau b. 1860 first elected in 1897 as Liberal member for Témiscouata, Quebec.
 Leah Gazan first elected in 2019 as New Democratic Party member for Winnipeg Centre, Manitoba.

Ge 

 George Reginald Geary b. 1873 first elected in 1925 as Conservative member for Toronto South, Ontario.
 Marvin Gelber b. 1912   first elected in 1963 as Liberal member for York South, Ontario.
 Pierre Samuel Gendron b. 1828 first elected in 1867 as Conservative member for Bagot, Quebec.
 Romuald Gendron b. 1865 first elected in 1921 as Liberal member for Wright, Quebec.
 Rosaire Gendron b. 1920 first elected in 1963 as Liberal member for Rivière-du-Loup—Témiscouata, Quebec.
 Bernard Généreux b. 1962 first elected in 2009 as Conservative member for Montmagny—L'Islet—Kamouraska—Rivière-du-Loup, Quebec.
 Réjean Genest b. 1946 first elected in 2011 as New Democratic Party member for Shefford, Quebec. 
 Jonathan Genest-Jourdain b. 1979 first elected in 2011 as New Democratic Party member for Manicouagan, Quebec. 
 Garnett Genuis b. 1987 first elected in 2015 as Conservative member for Sherwood Park—Fort Saskatchewan, Alberta.
 Christophe Alphonse Geoffrion b. 1843 first elected in 1895 as Liberal member for Verchères, Quebec.
 Félix Geoffrion b. 1832 first elected in 1867 as Liberal member for Verchères, Quebec.
 Victor Geoffrion b. 1851 first elected in 1900 as Liberal member for Chambly—Verchères, Quebec.
 Edmund William George b. 1908 first elected in 1949 as Liberal member for Westmorland, New Brunswick.
 François Gérin b. 1944 first elected in 1984 as Progressive Conservative member for Mégantic—Compton—Stanstead, Quebec.
 Bud Germa b. 1920 first elected in 1967 as New Democratic Party member for Sudbury, Ontario.
 William Manly German b. 1851 first elected in 1891 as Liberal member for Welland, Ontario.
 Jon Gerrard b. 1947 first elected in 1993 as Liberal member for Portage—Interlake, Manitoba.
 Mark Gerretsen b. 1975 first elected in 2015 as Liberal member for Kingston and the Islands, Ontario.
 Frederick William Gershaw b. 1883 first elected in 1925 as Liberal member for Medicine Hat, Alberta.
 Aurèle Gervais b. 1933 first elected in 1984 as Progressive Conservative member for Timmins—Chapleau, Ontario.
 Honoré Hippolyte Achille Gervais b. 1864 first elected in 1904 as Liberal member for St. James, Quebec.
 Joseph-Charles-Théodore Gervais b. 1868 first elected in 1917 as Laurier Liberal member for Berthier, Quebec.
 Paul Mullins Gervais b. 1925 first elected in 1968 as Liberal member for Sherbrooke, Quebec.

Gi 

 Thomas Nicholson Gibbs b. 1821 first elected in 1867 as Liberal-Conservative member for Ontario South, Ontario.
 William Henry Gibbs b. 1823 first elected in 1872 as Conservative member for Ontario North, Ontario.
 Marie Gibeau b. 1950 first elected in 1988 as Progressive Conservative member for Bourassa, Quebec.
 Alexander Gibson b. 1852 first elected in 1900 as Liberal member for York, New Brunswick.
 Colin David Gibson b. 1922 first elected in 1968 as Liberal member for Hamilton—Wentworth, Ontario.
 Colin William George Gibson b. 1891   first elected in 1940 as Liberal member for Hamilton West, Ontario.
 John Lambert Gibson b. 1906   first elected in 1945 as Independent Liberal member for Comox—Alberni, British Columbia.
 William Gibson b. 1815 first elected in 1872 as Independent Liberal member for Dundas, Ontario.
 William Gibson b. 1849 first elected in 1891 as Liberal member for Lincoln and Niagara, Ontario.
 Georges Auguste Gigault b. 1845 first elected in 1878 as Conservative member for Rouville, Quebec.
 Alain Giguère b. 1958 first elected in 2011 as New Democratic Party member for Marc-Aurèle-Fortin, Quebec.
 Arthur Gilbert b. 1879   first elected in 1910 as Nationalist member for Drummond—Arthabaska, Quebec.
 John Gilbert b. 1921   first elected in 1965 as New Democratic Party member for Broadview, Ontario.
 James Gordon Gilchrist b. 1928   first elected in 1979 as Progressive Conservative member for Scarborough East, Ontario.
 Charles Gill b. 1844 first elected in 1874 as Conservative member for Yamaska, Quebec.
 Marilène Gill b. 1977 first elected in 2015 as Bloc Québécois member for Manicouagan, Quebec.
 Parm Gill b. 1974 first elected in 2011 as Conservative member for Brampton—Springdale, Ontario. 
 Alastair Gillespie b. 1922   first elected in 1968 as Liberal member for Etobicoke, Ontario.
 André Gillet b. 1916   first elected in 1958 as Progressive Conservative member for Mercier, Quebec.
 James McPhail Gillies b. 1924   first elected in 1972 as Progressive Conservative member for Don Valley, Ontario.
 John Gillies b. 1837 first elected in 1872 as Liberal member for Bruce North, Ontario.
 Joseph Alexander Gillies b. 1849 first elected in 1891 as Conservative member for Richmond, Nova Scotia.
 Clarence Gillis b. 1895   first elected in 1940 as CCF member for Cape Breton South, Nova Scotia.
 Arthur Hill Gillmor b. 1824 first elected in 1874 as Liberal member for Charlotte, New Brunswick.
 James Gilmour (politician) b. 1842 first elected in 1896 as Conservative member for Middlesex East, Ontario.
 William Gilmour b. 1942   first elected in 1993 as Reform member for Comox—Alberni, British Columbia.
 Pierre J.J. Georges Adelard Gimaïel b. 1949   first elected in 1980 as Liberal member for Lac-Saint-Jean, Quebec.
 Ernest-Omer Gingras b. 1887   first elected in 1949 as Liberal member for Richmond—Wolfe, Quebec.
 René Gingras b. 1938 first elected in 1980 as Liberal member for Abitibi, Quebec.
 Maurice Gingues b. 1903 first elected in 1940 as Liberal member for Sherbrooke, Quebec.
 Albert Girard b. 1949 first elected in 1984 as Progressive Conservative member for Restigouche, New Brunswick.
 Fernand Girard b. 1924 first elected in 1953 as Independent member for Lapointe, Quebec.
 Joseph Girard b. 1853 first elected in 1900 as Conservative member for Chicoutimi—Saguenay, Quebec.
 Jocelyne Girard-Bujold b. 1943 first elected in 1997 as Bloc Québécois member for Jonquière, Quebec.
 Désiré Girouard b. 1836 first elected in 1878 as Conservative member for Jacques Cartier, Quebec.
 Gérard Girouard b. 1933 first elected in 1963 as Social Credit member for Labelle, Quebec.
 Gilbert Anselme Girouard b. 1846 first elected in 1878 as Liberal-Conservative member for Kent, New Brunswick.
 Joseph Girouard b. 1854 first elected in 1892 as Conservative member for Two Mountains, Quebec.
 Wilfrid Girouard b. 1891 first elected in 1925 as Liberal member for Drummond—Arthabaska, Quebec.
 Philip Gerald Givens b. 1922 first elected in 1968 as Liberal member for York West, Ontario.

Gl 

 Robert William Gladstone b. 1879 first elected in 1935 as Liberal member for Wellington South, Ontario.
 Marilyn Gladu b. 1962 first elected in 2015 as Conservative member for Sarnia—Lambton, Ontario.
 Oscar Gladu b. 1870 first elected in 1904 as Liberal member for Yamaska, Quebec.
 David Glass b. 1829 first elected in 1872 as Conservative member for Middlesex East, Ontario.
 Samuel Francis Glass b. 1861 first elected in 1913 as Conservative member for Middlesex East, Ontario.
 Alfred Gleave b. 1911 first elected in 1968 as New Democratic Party member for Saskatoon—Biggar, Saskatchewan.
 Francis Wayland Glen b. 1836 first elected in 1878 as Liberal member for Ontario South, Ontario.
 James Allison Glen b. 1877 first elected in 1926 as Liberal Progressive member for Marquette, Manitoba.
 Charles Auguste Maximilien Globensky b. 1830 first elected in 1875 as Independent member for Two Mountains, Quebec.
 Shelly Glover b. 1967 first elected in 2008 as Conservative member for St. Boniface, Manitoba.

Go 

 Samuel Gobeil b. 1875   first elected in 1930 as Conservative member for Compton, Quebec.
 Joseph Godbout b. 1850 first elected in 1887 as Independent Liberal member for Beauce, Quebec.
 Marc Godbout b. 1951   first elected in 2004 as Liberal member for Ottawa—Orléans, Ontario.
 John Ferguson Godfrey b. 1942 first elected in 1993 as Liberal member for Don Valley West, Ontario.
 François Benjamin Godin b. 1828 first elected in 1867 as Liberal member for Joliette, Quebec.
 Joël Godin b. 1965 first elected in 2015 as Conservative member for Portneuf—Jacques-Cartier, Quebec.
 Maurice Godin b. 1932 first elected in 1993 as Bloc Québécois member for Châteauguay, Quebec.
 Osias Godin b. 1911 first elected in 1958 as Liberal member for Nickel Belt, Ontario.
 Roland Godin b. 1926 first elected in 1965 as Ralliement Créditiste member for Portneuf, Quebec.
 Yvon Godin b. 1955 first elected in 1997 as New Democratic Party member for Acadie—Bathurst, New Brunswick.
 Robert Goguen b. 1957 first elected in 2011 as Conservative member for Moncton—Riverview—Dieppe, New Brunswick.
 William Henry Golding b. 1878 first elected in 1932 as Liberal member for Huron South, Ontario.
 Peter Goldring b. 1944 first elected in 1997 as Reform member for Edmonton East, Alberta.
 Pamela Goldsmith-Jones b. 1961 first elected in 2015 as Liberal member for West Vancouver—Sunshine Coast—Sea to Sky Country, British Columbia.
 William Charles Good b. 1876 first elected in 1921 as Independent Progressive member for Brant, Ontario.
 Ralph Edward Goodale b. 1949 first elected in 1974 as Liberal member for Assiniboia, Saskatchewan.
 Thomas Henry Goode b. 1933 first elected in 1968 as Liberal member for Burnaby—Richmond, British Columbia.
 Tom Goode b. 1902 first elected in 1949 as Liberal member for Burnaby—Richmond, British Columbia.
 Arthur Samuel Goodeve b. 1860 first elected in 1908 as Conservative member for Kootenay, British Columbia.
 William Thomas Goodison b. 1876 first elected in 1925 as Liberal member for Lambton West, Ontario.
 Laila Goodridge first elected in 2021 as Conservative member for Fort McMurray—Cold Lake, Alberta. 
 Gary Goodyear b. 1958 first elected in 2004 as Conservative member for Cambridge, Ontario.
 Adam Gordon b. 1831 first elected in 1874 as Liberal member for Ontario North, Ontario.
 David Alexander Gordon b. 1858 first elected in 1904 as Liberal member for Kent East, Ontario.
 David William Gordon b. 1832 first elected in 1882 as Liberal-Conservative member for Vancouver, British Columbia.
 George Gordon b. 1865 first elected in 1908 as Conservative member for Nipissing, Ontario.
 George Newcombe Gordon b. 1879 first elected in 1921 as Liberal member for Peterborough West, Ontario.
 Walter Lockhart Gordon b. 1906 first elected in 1962 as Liberal member for Davenport, Ontario.
 Wesley Ashton Gordon b. 1884 first elected in 1930 as Conservative member for Timiskaming South, Ontario.
 John Kenneth Gormley b. 1957 first elected in 1984 as Progressive Conservative member for The Battlefords—Meadow Lake, Saskatchewan.
 Bal Gosal b. 1960 first elected in 2011 as Conservative member for Bramalea—Gore—Malton, Ontario. 
 Henri A. Gosselin b. 1891 first elected in 1949 as Liberal member for Brome—Missisquoi, Quebec.
 Louis Gosselin b. 1879 first elected in 1935 as Liberal member for Brome—Missisquoi, Quebec.
 Eccles James Gott b. 1884 first elected in 1925 as Conservative member for Essex South, Ontario.
 Bill Gottselig b. 1934 first elected in 1984 as Progressive Conservative member for Moose Jaw, Saskatchewan.
 Monson Henry Goudge b. 1829 first elected in 1873 as Liberal member for Hants, Nova Scotia.
 Lomer Gouin b. 1861 first elected in 1921 as Liberal member for Laurier—Outremont, Quebec.
 Jim Gouk b. 1946 first elected in 1993 as Reform member for Kootenay West—Revelstoke, British Columbia.
 Isaac James Gould b. 1839 first elected in 1900 as Liberal member for Ontario West, Ontario.
 Karina Gould b. 1987 Liberal member for Burlington, Ontario. 
 Oliver Robert Gould b. 1874 first elected in 1919 as United Farmers member for Assiniboia, Saskatchewan.
 Alfred Goulet b. 1875 first elected in 1925 as Liberal member for Russell, Ontario.
 Joseph-Omer Gour b. 1893 first elected in 1945 as Liberal member for Russell, Ontario.
 David Gourd b. 1885 first elected in 1945 as Liberal member for Chapleau, Quebec.
 Robert Gourd first elected in 1979 as Liberal member for Argenteuil, Quebec.
 Gaston Gourde b. 1950 first elected in 1981 as Liberal member for Lévis, Quebec.
 Jacques Gourde b. 1964 first elected in 2006 as Conservative member for Lotbinière—Chutes-de-la-Chaudière, Quebec.
 Seymour Eugene Gourley b. 1854 first elected in 1900 as Conservative member for Colchester, Nova Scotia.
 Jean-Pierre Goyer b. 1932 first elected in 1965 as Liberal member for Dollard, Quebec.

Gr 

 Heward Grafftey b. 1928 first elected in 1958 as Progressive Conservative member for Brome—Missisquoi, Quebec.
 Bill Graham b. 1939 first elected in 1993 as Liberal member for Rosedale, Ontario.
 David de Burgh Graham b. 1981 first elected in 2015 as Liberal member for Laurentides—Labelle, Quebec.
 Duncan Graham b. 1845 first elected in 1897 as Independent Liberal member for Ontario North, Ontario.
 George Perry Graham b. 1859 first elected in 1907 as Liberal member for Brockville, Ontario.
 Roy Theodore Graham b. 1887 first elected in 1940 as Liberal member for Swift Current, Saskatchewan.
 Stan Graham b. 1926 first elected in 1979 as Progressive Conservative member for Kootenay East—Revelstoke, British Columbia.
 Paul Étienne Grandbois b. 1846 first elected in 1878 as Conservative member for Témiscouata, Quebec.
 Charles Granger b. 1912 first elected in 1958 as Liberal member for Grand Falls—White Bay—Labrador, Newfoundland and Labrador.
 George Davidson Grant b. 1870 first elected in 1903 as Liberal member for Ontario North, Ontario.
 James Alexander Grant b. 1831 first elected in 1867 as Conservative member for Russell, Ontario.
 Thomas Vincent Grant b. 1876 first elected in 1935 as Liberal member for King's, Prince Edward Island.
 Michel Gravel b. 1939 first elected in 1984 as Progressive Conservative member for Gamelin, Quebec.
 Raymond Gravel b. 1952 first elected in 2006 as Bloc Québécois member for Repentigny, Quebec. 
 Claude Gravelle b. 1949 first elected in 2008 as New Democratic member for Nickel Belt, Ontario.
 Darryl Gray b. 1946 first elected in 1984 as Progressive Conservative member for Bonaventure—Îles-de-la-Madeleine, Quebec.
 Herb Gray b. 1931 first elected in 1962 as Liberal member for Essex West, Ontario.
 John Hamilton Gray b. 1814 first elected in 1867 as Conservative member for City and County of St. John, New Brunswick.
 Ross Wilfred Gray b. 1897 first elected in 1929 as Liberal member for Lambton West, Ontario.
 Tracy Gray first elected in 2019 as Conservative member for Kelowna—Lake Country, British Columbia. 
 William Gray b. 1862 first elected in 1915 as Conservative member for London, Ontario.
 Gordon Graydon b. 1896 first elected in 1935 as Conservative member for Peel, Ontario.
 Howard Charles Green b. 1895 first elected in 1935 as Conservative member for Vancouver South, British Columbia.
 Matthew Green (Canadian politician) b. 1980 first elected in 2019 as New Democratic Party member for Hamilton Centre, Ontario. 
 Robert Francis Green b. 1861 first elected in 1912 as Conservative member for Kootenay, British Columbia.
 Lorne Greenaway b. 1933 first elected in 1979 as Progressive Conservative member for Cariboo—Chilcotin, British Columbia.
 Barbara Greene b. 1945 first elected in 1988 as Progressive Conservative member for Don Valley North, Ontario.
 John James Greene b. 1920 first elected in 1963 as Liberal member for Renfrew South, Ontario.
 Thomas Greenway b. 1838 first elected in 1875 as Independent member for Huron South, Ontario.
 Milton Gregg b. 1892 first elected in 1947 as Liberal member for York—Sunbury, New Brunswick.
 Gilles Grégoire b. 1926   first elected in 1962 as Social Credit member for Lapointe, Quebec.
 John Albert Gregory b. 1878   first elected in 1940 as Liberal member for The Battlefords, Saskatchewan.
 Lucien Grenier b. 1925   first elected in 1958 as Progressive Conservative member for Bonaventure, Quebec.
 Gurmant Grewal b. 1957   first elected in 1997 as Reform member for Surrey Central, British Columbia.
 Nina Grewal b. 1958   first elected in 2004 as Conservative member for Fleetwood—Port Kells, British Columbia.
 Raj Grewal b. 1985 first elected in 2015 as Liberal member for Brampton East, Ontario.
 Deborah Grey b. 1952   first elected in 1989 as Reform member for Beaver River, Alberta.
 Terrence Grier b. 1936   first elected in 1972 as New Democratic Party member for Toronto—Lakeshore, Ontario.
 William Griesbach b. 1878   first elected in 1917 as Unionist member for Edmonton West, Alberta.
 James Nicol Grieve b. 1855 first elected in 1891 as Liberal member for Perth North, Ontario.
 Lee Elgy Grills b. 1904 first elected in 1957 as Progressive Conservative member for Hastings South, Ontario.
 Robert Watson Grimmer b. 1866 first elected in 1921 as Conservative member for Charlotte, New Brunswick.
 Richard Grisé b. 1944 first elected in 1984 as Progressive Conservative member for Chambly, Quebec.
 Sadia Groguhé b. 1962 first elected in 2011 as New Democratic Party member for Saint-Lambert, Quebec.
 Gilles Grondin b. 1943 first elected in 1986 as Liberal member for Saint-Maurice, Quebec.
 David Walter Groos b. 1918 first elected in 1963 as Liberal member for Victoria, British Columbia.
 Ivan Grose b. 1928 first elected in 1993 as Liberal member for Oshawa, Ontario.
 Peregrine Maitland Grover b. 1818 first elected in 1867 as Conservative member for Peterborough East, Ontario.
 Herbert G. Grubel b. 1934 first elected in 1993 as Reform member for Capilano—Howe Sound, British Columbia.
 Dennis Gruending b. 1948 first elected in 1999 as New Democratic Party member for Saskatoon—Rosetown—Biggar, Saskatchewan.

Gu 

 Albina Guarnieri b. 1953 first elected in 1988 as Liberal member for Mississauga East, Ontario.
 Joseph-Phillippe Guay b. 1915 first elected in 1968 as Liberal member for St. Boniface, Manitoba.
 Monique Guay b. 1959 first elected in 1993 as Bloc Québécois member for Laurentides, Quebec.
 Pierre Malcom Guay b. 1848 first elected in 1885 as Liberal member for Lévis, Quebec.
 Raynald Joseph Albert Guay b. 1933 first elected in 1963 as Liberal member for Lévis, Quebec.
 Helena Guergis b. 1969 first elected in 2004 as Conservative member for Simcoe—Grey, Ontario.
 James John Edmund Guérin b. 1856 first elected in 1925 as Liberal member for St. Ann, Quebec.
 Édouard Guilbault b. 1834 first elected in 1882 as Conservative member for Joliette, Quebec.
 Jacques Guilbault b. 1936 first elected in 1968 as Liberal member for Saint-Jacques, Quebec.
 Jean-Guy Guilbault b. 1931 first elected in 1984 as Progressive Conservative member for Drummond, Quebec.
 Joseph Pierre Octave Guilbault b. 1870 first elected in 1911 as Conservative member for Joliette, Quebec.
 Steven Guilbeault b. 1970 first elected in 2019 as Liberal member for Laurier—Sainte-Marie, Quebec.
 George Guillet b. 1840 first elected in 1881 as Conservative member for Northumberland West, Ontario.
 Claude Guimond b. 1963 first elected in 2008 as Bloc Québécois member for Rimouski-Neigette—Témiscouata—Les Basques, Quebec. 
 Michel Guimond b. 1953 first elected in 1993 as Bloc Québécois member for Beauport—Montmorency—Orléans, Quebec.
 Jean-François Guité b. 1852 first elected in 1897 as Liberal member for Bonaventure, Quebec.
 Deane Gundlock b. 1914 first elected in 1958 as Progressive Conservative member for Lethbridge, Alberta.
 Alexander Gunn b. 1828 first elected in 1878 as Liberal member for Kingston, Ontario.
 Benjamin B. Gunn b. 1860 first elected in 1904 as Conservative member for Huron South, Ontario.
 Gary Gurbin b. 1941 first elected in 1979 as Progressive Conservative member for Bruce—Grey, Ontario.
 Leonard Gustafson b. 1933 first elected in 1979 as Progressive Conservative member for Assiniboia, Saskatchewan.
 Donald Guthrie b. 1840 first elected in 1876 as Liberal member for Wellington South, Ontario.
 Hugh Guthrie b. 1866 first elected in 1900 as Liberal member for Wellington South, Ontario.

G